Saetosacculina is a genus of moths belonging to the family Tortricidae.

Species
Saetosacculina degenerans (Meyrick, 1930)

See also
List of Tortricidae genera

References

 , 1990: Comments on the catalogue of Meyrick types of Tortricidae (Lepidoptera) in the Museum of Vienna with descriptions of new genera. Annales Zoologici, Polska Akademia Nauk. 43: 395–404.

External links
Tortricid.net

Euliini
Tortricidae genera